A jail is a prison.

Jail may also refer to:

Computing
 Chroot jail, the result of a chroot
 FreeBSD jail, a system-level virtualization mechanism
 In operating-system-level virtualization, any virtual user-space instance

Entertainment
 Jail (2009 film), a Bollywood prison drama
 Jail (2018 film), Nigerian
 Jail (2021 film), an Indian action film
 Jail (Big Mama Thornton album), 1975
 Jail (TV series), an American reality show
 Jail (Monopoly), a feature of the board game
 "Jail" (song), on the 2021 album Donda by Kanye West